Rowing competitions at the 2019 Pan American Games in Lima, Peru are scheduled to be held between August 6 and 10, 2019 at Albufera Medio Mundo in Huacho.

Fourteen medal events are scheduled to be contested, eight for males and six for females.

Medal table

Medalists

Men's events

  Marcos Sarraute was stripped of his gold medal due to a doping violation. Uruguay team was disqualified.

Women's events

Qualification

A total of 220 rowers will qualify to compete at the games. A country may only enter a maximum of 26 rowers. All qualification will be done at the 2018 Qualifier Championship (except the men's eights which will be by entry only), where a specific number of boats will qualify in each of the fourteen events.

References

External links
Results book

 
Events at the 2019 Pan American Games
2019
2019 in rowing